The Bab-e-Khyber is a monument situated at the entrance of the Khyber Pass in the Khyber Pakhtunkhwa province of Pakistan. The gate is located immediately west of Peshawar, with the historic Jamrud Fort lying adjacent to it.

Gate introduction 

The gate was built in 1963 by the military government of Ayub Khan. Khyber Gate is considered to be the most famous post-independence structure in Khyber Agency.

References

Archaeological sites in Khyber Pakhtunkhwa